The Geissfluegrat is a minor summit east of the Geissflue, in the eastern Jura Mountains. It is located between the Swiss cantons of Aargau and Solothurn. With an elevation of 908 metres above sea level, the Geissfluegrat is the highest point in Aargau. It is also the easternmost summit above 900 metres in the Jura Mountains.

References

External links
Geissfluegrat on Hikr

Mountains of Switzerland
Mountains of Aargau
Highest points of Swiss cantons
Mountains of the Jura
Mountains of the canton of Solothurn
Mountains of Switzerland under 1000 metres
Aargau–Solothurn border